Codos is a municipality located in the province of Zaragoza, Aragon, Spain. According to the 2009 census (INE), the municipality has a population of 260 inhabitants.

This town is located between the Sierra de Vicort and the Sierra de Algairén in the Grio River valley.

See also
List of municipalities in Zaragoza

References

 

Municipalities in the Province of Zaragoza